Asaf Khan may refer to several members of the nobility of the Mughal Dynasty of India:

 Asaf Khan I, or Khwaja Abdul Majid, during the reign of Akbar
 Abu'l-Hasan Asaf Khan (1569–1641), Grand Vizier of the Mughal emperor Shah Jahan